In histopathology, feathery degeneration, formally feathery degeneration of hepatocytes, is a form of liver parenchymal cell (i.e. hepatocyte) death associated with cholestasis.

Cells undergoing this form of cell death have a flocculant appearing cytoplasm, and are larger than normal hepatocytes.

Relation to ballooning degeneration
Feathery degeneration is somewhat similar in appearance to ballooning degeneration, which is due to other causes (e.g. alcohol, obesity); it also has cytoplasmic clearing and cell swelling.

See also
Elevated alkaline phosphatase (ALP)
Mallory body
Non-alcoholic fatty liver disease
Steatohepatitis
Primary sclerosing cholangitis

Additional images

References

Histopathology